Global Underground 017: Danny Tenaglia, London is a DJ mix album in the Global Underground series, compiled and mixed by Danny Tenaglia. The mix is a retrospective look of two sets at Home superclub in London, England.

Following his international breakthrough and subsequent high demand in the UK as ‘the DJ’s DJ’, Danny Tenaglia was secured for a much anticipated residency at London's brand new superclub, Home.

The troubled, short history of the mega-venue has tended to overshadow the fact that there were some amazing nights there. Danny kept a surreal level of mystique about his visits, playing behind a dark cloth so as keep the focus on the music (quite different from his familiar torch and microphone wielding booth persona).

With the now widespread popularity of his signature tribal sound, DT was obsessively customising his music, making killer edits and armed with boxes of dark, thunderous effects to keep his sets unique. GU017 represents this technical evolution – a process that has become standard practice for many DJs today.

Track listing

Disc one 
 Next Evidence - "Sands of Time" – 7:28
 Men from the Nile - "Watch Them Come" – 6:17
 The Return - "New Day" – 4:40
 The Ananda Project - "Cascades of Colour" – 6:21
 Katcha - "Touched by God" – 6:26
 ATFC presents Onephatdeeva - "In and out of My Life" – 8:35
 Minimal Funk 4 - "Definition of House" – 4:38
 Coco Da Silva - "Saudade" – 7:08
 Da Boo - "50,000 Headmen" – 4:33
 Nathan Hawks - "Back to the Q" – 5:57
 Peace Division - "Tribal Phunk" – 4:05
 Dietrich Schoenemann - "19 Bullets" – 5:39

Disc two 
 Microworld - "Signals" – 10:01
 DJ Linus - "Otradnojoe" – 7:01
 Lando - "Magical Digital Drum" – 5:59
 Elegia - "Basic" – 5:57
 Evolution - "Phoenix" – 4:16
 F2 - "Dominica" – 5:09
 Vegas Soul - "Junk Funk" – 5:15
 MK - "Burning" – 5:46
 Schiller - "Ruhe" – 7:01
 I-Ching feat DJ Patrick Reid - "Ways of Love" – 4:34
 Art of Trance - "Monsoon" – 7:02
 Devilfish - "Live 1999" – 4:29

References

External links 

Danny Tenaglia albums
Global Underground
2000 compilation albums
DJ mix albums